In commutative algebra, the prime spectrum (or simply the spectrum) of a ring R is the set of all prime ideals of R, and is usually denoted by ; in algebraic geometry it is simultaneously a topological space equipped with the sheaf of rings .

Zariski topology 

This topology is called the Zariski topology.

A basis for the Zariski topology can be constructed as follows. For f ∈ R, define Df to be the set of prime ideals of R not containing f.

 is a compact space, but almost never Hausdorff: in fact, the maximal ideals in R are precisely the closed points in this topology. By the same reasoning, it is not, in general, a T1 space. However,  is always a Kolmogorov space (satisfies the T0 axiom); it is also a spectral space.

Sheaves and schemes 

Given the space  with the Zariski topology, the structure sheaf OX is defined on the distinguished open subsets Df by setting Γ(Df, OX) = Rf, the localization of R by the powers of f. It can be shown that this defines a B-sheaf and therefore that it defines a sheaf. In more detail, the distinguished open subsets are a basis of the Zariski topology, so for an arbitrary open set U, written as the union of {Dfi}i∈I, we set Γ(U,OX) = limi∈I Rfi. One may check that this presheaf is a sheaf, so  is a ringed space. Any ringed space isomorphic to one of this form is called an affine scheme. General schemes are obtained by gluing affine schemes together.

On the distinguished open subsets set Γ(Df) = Mf, using the localization of a module. A sheaf of this form is called a quasicoherent sheaf.

Consequently,  is a locally ringed space.

If R is an integral domain, with field of fractions K, then we can describe the ring Γ(U,OX) more concretely as follows.  We say that an element f in K is regular at a point P in X if it can be represented as a fraction f = a/b with b not in P.  Note that this agrees with the notion of a regular function in algebraic geometry.  Using this definition, we can describe Γ(U,OX) as precisely the set of elements of K which are regular at every point P in U.

Functorial perspective 

It is useful to use the language of category theory and observe that  is a functor. In this way,  can be seen as a contravariant functor from the category of commutative rings to the category of topological spaces. Moreover, for every prime  the homomorphism  descends to homomorphisms

of local rings. Thus  even defines a contravariant functor from the category of commutative rings to the category of locally ringed spaces. In fact it is the universal such functor hence can be used to define the functor  up to natural isomorphism.

The functor  yields a contravariant equivalence between the category of commutative rings and the category of affine schemes; each of these categories is often thought of as the opposite category of the other.

Motivation from algebraic geometry 

Following on from the example, in algebraic geometry one studies algebraic sets, i.e. subsets of Kn (where K is an algebraically closed field) that are defined as the common zeros of a set of polynomials in n variables. If A is such an algebraic set, one considers the commutative ring R of all polynomial functions A → K. The maximal ideals of R correspond to the points of A (because K is algebraically closed), and the prime ideals of R correspond to the subvarieties of A (an algebraic set is called irreducible or a variety if it cannot be written as the union of two proper algebraic subsets).

The spectrum of R therefore consists of the points of A together with elements for all subvarieties of A. The points of A are closed in the spectrum, while the elements corresponding to subvarieties have a closure consisting of all their points and subvarieties. If one only considers the points of A, i.e. the maximal ideals in R, then the Zariski topology defined above coincides with the Zariski topology defined on algebraic sets (which has precisely the algebraic subsets as closed sets). Specifically, the maximal ideals in R, i.e. , together with the Zariski topology, is homeomorphic to A also with the Zariski topology.

One can thus view the topological space  as an "enrichment" of the topological space A (with Zariski topology): for every subvariety of A, one additional non-closed point has been introduced, and this point "keeps track" of the corresponding subvariety. One thinks of this point as the generic point for the subvariety. By studying spectra of polynomial rings instead of algebraic sets with Zariski topology, one can generalize the concepts of algebraic geometry to non-algebraically closed fields and beyond, eventually arriving at the language of schemes.

Examples 
 The affine scheme  is the final object in the category of affine schemes since  is the initial object in the category of commutative rings.
From the functor of points perspective, a point  can be identified with the evaluation morphism . This fundamental observation allows us to give meaning to other affine schemes.
 The prime spectrum of a Boolean ring (e.g., a power set ring) is a (Hausdorff) compact space.
 (M. Hochster) A topological space is homeomorphic to the prime spectrum of a commutative ring (i.e., a spectral space) if and only if it is quasi-compact, quasi-separated and sober.

Non-affine examples 
Here are some examples of schemes that are not affine schemes. They are constructed from gluing affine schemes together.
 The Projective -Space  over a field  . This can be easily generalized to any base ring, see Proj construction (in fact, we can define Projective Space for any base scheme).
 Affine plane minus the origin. Inside  are distinguished open affine subschemes . Their union  is the affine plane with the origin taken out.

Non-Zariski topologies on a prime spectrum 

Some authors (notably M. Hochster) consider topologies on prime spectra other than Zariski topology.

In , Hochster considers what he calls the patch topology on a prime spectrum.

Global or relative Spec 
There is a relative version of the functor  called global , or relative . For a scheme  and a quasi-coherent sheaf of -algebras , there is a scheme  and a morphism  such that for every open affine , there is an isomorphism , and such that for open affines , the inclusion  is induced by the restriction map . That is, as ring homomorphisms induce opposite maps of spectra, the restriction maps of a sheaf of algebras induce the inclusion maps of the spectra that make up the Spec of the sheaf.

Global Spec has a universal property similar to the universal property for ordinary Spec. In formulas,

where  is a morphism of schemes.

Example of a relative Spec 

where the composition of the bottom arrows

gives the line containing the point  and the origin.

Representation theory perspective 
From the perspective of representation theory, a prime ideal I corresponds to a module R/I, and the spectrum of a ring corresponds to irreducible cyclic representations of R, while more general subvarieties correspond to possibly reducible representations that need not be cyclic. Recall that abstractly, the representation theory of a group is the study of modules over its group algebra.

The connection to representation theory is clearer if one considers the polynomial ring  or, without a basis,  As the latter formulation makes clear, a polynomial ring is the group algebra over a vector space, and writing in terms of  corresponds to choosing a basis for the vector space. Then an ideal I, or equivalently a module  is a cyclic representation of R (cyclic meaning generated by 1 element as an R-module; this generalizes 1-dimensional representations).

In the case that the field is algebraically closed (say, the complex numbers), every maximal ideal corresponds to a point in n-space, by the nullstellensatz (the maximal ideal generated by  corresponds to the point ).

Thus, points in n-space, thought of as the max spec of  correspond precisely to 1-dimensional representations of R, while finite sets of points correspond to finite-dimensional representations (which are reducible, corresponding geometrically to being a union, and algebraically to not being a prime ideal). The non-maximal ideals then correspond to infinite-dimensional representations.

Functional analysis perspective 

The term "spectrum" comes from the use in operator theory.
Given a linear operator T on a finite-dimensional vector space V, one can consider the vector space with operator as a module over the polynomial ring in one variable R=K[T], as in the structure theorem for finitely generated modules over a principal ideal domain. Then the spectrum of K[T] (as a ring) equals the spectrum of T (as an operator).

Further, the geometric structure of the spectrum of the ring (equivalently, the algebraic structure of the module) captures the behavior of the spectrum of the operator, such as algebraic multiplicity and geometric multiplicity. For instance, for the 2×2 identity matrix has corresponding module:

the 2×2 zero matrix has module

showing geometric multiplicity 2 for the zero eigenvalue,
while a non-trivial 2×2 nilpotent matrix has module

showing algebraic multiplicity 2 but geometric multiplicity 1.

In more detail:
 the eigenvalues (with geometric multiplicity) of the operator correspond to the (reduced) points of the variety, with multiplicity;
 the primary decomposition of the module corresponds to the unreduced points of the variety;
 a diagonalizable (semisimple) operator corresponds to a reduced variety;
 a cyclic module (one generator) corresponds to the operator having a cyclic vector (a vector whose orbit under T spans the space);
 the last invariant factor of the module equals the minimal polynomial of the operator, and the product of the invariant factors equals the characteristic polynomial.

Generalizations 
The spectrum can be generalized from rings to C*-algebras in operator theory, yielding the notion of the spectrum of a C*-algebra. Indeed, any commutative C*-algebra can be realized as the algebra of scalars of a Hausdorff space in this way, yielding the same correspondence as between a ring and its spectrum. Generalizing to non-commutative C*-algebras yields noncommutative topology.

See also 
 Scheme (mathematics)
 Projective scheme
 Spectrum of a matrix
 Serre's theorem on affineness
 Étale spectrum
 Ziegler spectrum
 Primitive spectrum

Citations

References

External links 
 Kevin R. Coombes: The Spectrum of a Ring
 
 
 

Commutative algebra
Scheme theory
Prime ideals
Functional analysis